The Central District of Chenaran County is a district (bakhsh) in Chenaran County, Razavi Khorasan Province, Iran. At the 2006 census, its population was 73,977, in 18,137 families.  The district has one city: Chenaran.  The district has three rural districts (dehestan): Baq Mej Rural District, Chenaran Rural District, and Radkan Rural District.

References 

Districts of Razavi Khorasan Province
Chenaran County